Clathrodrillia is a genus of sea snails, marine gastropod mollusks in the family Drilliidae.

Description
Previously this genus was regarded as a subgenus of Drillia. It differs by its stronger spiral sculpture. The terminal varix, blotched with color, is also more pronounced. These are brown or brownish clathrate species.

Species
Species within the genus Clathrodrillia include:
 Clathrodrillia allyniana (Hertlein & Strong, 1951).
 Clathrodrillia berryi (McLean & Poorman, 1971).
 Clathrodrillia callianira Dall, 1919.
 Clathrodrillia colombiana Fallon, 2016.
 Clathrodrillia dautzenbergi (Tippett, 1995).
 Clathrodrillia dolana Dall, 1927.
 Clathrodrillia flavidula (Lamarck, 1822).
 Clathrodrillia garciai Fallon, 2016.
 Clathrodrillia gibbosa (Born, 1778).
 Clathrodrillia guadeloupensis Fallon, 2016.
 Clathrodrillia inimica Dall, 1927.
 † Clathrodrillia kutaiana Beets, 1985 
 Clathrodrillia lophoessa (Watson, 1882).
 Clathrodrillia marissae Fallon, 2016.
 Clathrodrillia orellana Dall, 1927.
 Clathrodrillia parva Fallon, 2016.
 Clathrodrillia petuchi (Tippett, 1995).
 Clathrodrillia rubrofasciata Fallon, 2016.
 Clathrodrillia salvadorica (Hertlein & Strong, 1951).
 Clathrodrillia solida (Adams C. B., 1850).
 Clathrodrillia tryoni (Dall, 1889).
 Clathrodrillia vezzaronellyae Cossignani, 2019
 Clathrodrillia walteri (Smith M., 1946).
 Clathrodrillia wolfei (Tippett, 1995).

Species brought into synonymy
 Clathrodrillia aenone (Dall, 1919): synonym of Pyrgospira obeliscus (Reeve, 1845).
 Clathrodrillia albicoma (Dall, 1889): synonym of Neodrillia albicoma (Dall, 1889).
 Clathrodrillia albinodata auct. non Reeve, 1846: synonym of Pilsbryspira nodata (C. B. Adams, 1850).
 Clathrodrillia alcestis Dall, 1919: synonym of Compsodrillia alcestis (Dall, 1919)
 Clathrodrillia alcmene Dall, 1919: synonym of Calliclava alcmene (Dall, 1919)
 Clathrodrillia alcyone Dall, 1919: synonym of Kylix alcyone (Dall, 1919)
 Clathrodrillia andromeda Dall, 1919: synonym of Hindsiclava andromeda (Dall, 1919)
 Clathrodrillia bicarinata Shasky, 1961 synonym of Compsodrillia bicarinata (Shasky, 1961)
 Clathrodrillia blakensis (Tippett, 2007): synonym of Neodrillia blakensis (Tippett, 2007)
 Clathrodrillia castianira Dall, 1919: synonym of Crockerella castianira (Dall, 1919)
 Clathrodrillia chaaci (Espinosa & Rolan, 1995): synonym of Fenimorea chaaci (Espinosa & Rolán, 1995)
 Clathrodrillia connelli (Kilburn, 1988): synonym of Drillia connelli Kilburn, 1988
 Clathrodrillia fanoa Dall, 1927: synonym of Compsodrillia fanoa (Dall, 1927) 
 Clathrodrillia fuscescens Reeve, 1843: synonym of Crassispira fuscescens (Reeve, 1843) 
 Clathrodrillia haliplexa Dall, 1919: synonym of Compsodrillia haliplexa (Dall, 1919)
 Clathrodrillia halis Dall, 1919: synonym of Carinodrillia halis (Dall, 1919)
 Clathrodrillia interpleura (Dall & Simpson, 1901): synonym of Buchema interpleura (Dall & Simpson, 1901)
 Clathrodrillia limans Dall, 1919: synonym of Crassispira pellisphocae (Reeve, 1845)
  † Clathrodrillia mareana Weisbord, 1962: synonym of Clathrodrillia gibbosa (Born, 1778)
 Clathrodrillia minor (Dautzenberg, 1900): synonym of Clathrodrillia dautzenbergi (Tippett, 1995)
 Clathrodrillia ostrearum Stearns, 1872: synonym of Pyrgospira ostrearum (Stearns, 1872) 
 Clathrodrillia paria (Reeve, 1846): synonym of Fenimorea paria (Reeve, 1846)
 Clathrodrillia paziana Dall, 1919: synonym of Kylix paziana (Dall, 1919)
 Clathrodrillia pentagonalis Dall, 1889: synonym of Bellaspira pentagonalis (Dall, 1889) 
 Clathodrillia perclathrata (Azuma, 1960): synonym of Clavus (Clathrodrillia) perclathrata Azuma, 1960 (nomen nudum) 
 Clathrodrillia ponciana (Dall & Simpson, 1901): synonym of Crassispira nigrescens (C. B. Adams, 1845)
 Clathrodrillia resina (Dall, 1908): synonym of Hindsiclava resina (Dall, 1908) 
 Clathrodrillia thestia Dall, 1919: synonym of Compsodrillia thestia (Dall, 1919)
 Clathrodrillia tholoides Watson, 1882: synonym of Kryptos tholoides (Watson, 1882)

References

External links
 Dall, W.H. (1918) Notes on the nomenclature of the mollusks of the family Turritidae. Proceedings of the United States National Museum, 54, 313–333
  Proceedings of the United States National Museum 70 (1927)  Dall,W.H. (1927), Small shells from dredgings off the southeast coast of the United States by the United States Fisheries steamer Albatross in 1885 and 1886. No. 2667, pp. 1-134.April 20, 1927
  Fallon P.J. (2016). Taxonomic review of tropical western Atlantic shallow water Drilliidae (Mollusca: Gastropoda: Conoidea) including descriptions of 100 new species. Zootaxa. 4090(1): 1-363
 WMSDB - Worldwide Mollusc Species Data Base: family Drilliidae

 
Drilliidae
Gastropod genera